The year 2019 was the 6th year in the history of the Kunlun Fight, a kickboxing promotion based in China. 2019 started with Kunlun Fight 80.

The events were broadcasts through television agreements in mainland China with Jiangsu TV and around the world with various other channels. The events were also streamed live on Xigua Video. Traditionally, most Kunlun Fight events have both tournament fights and superfights (single fights).

2019 KLF Tournament Champions

Events lists

List of Kunlun Fight events

List of Kunlun Combat Professional League events

League Standings

South Division

North Division

Kunlun Fight 80

Kunlun Fight 80 was a kickboxing event held by Kunlun Fight on February 24, 2019 at the Shanghai Chongming Stadium in Shanghai, China.

Background
This event featured a 8-man 100+-kilogram Tournaments to earn the 2019 KLF 100+ kg World Championship.

2019 KLF 100+ kg World Championship Tournament bracket  

1Haime Morais was injured and couldn't participate in the second round of the Grand Prix, and was subsequently replaced by Iraj Azizpour.

Results

Kunlun Fight 81

Kunlun Fight 81 was a kickboxing event held by Kunlun Fight on July 27, 2019 at the Kunlun Fight World Combat Sports Center in Beijing, China.

Background
This event featured a 8-man 75-kilogram Tournaments to earn the 2019 KLF 75 kg World Championship.

2019 KLF 75 kg World Championship Tournament bracket

Results

Kunlun Fight 82

Kunlun Fight 82 was a kickboxing event held by Kunlun Fight on September 13, 2019 at the Chishui Stadium in Zunyi, China.

Results

Kunlun Fight 83

Kunlun Fight 83 was a kickboxing event held by Kunlun Fight on September 14, 2019 at the Chishui Stadium in Zunyi, China.

Background
This event featured a 4-man 70-kilogram Tournaments to earn the 2019 KLF 70 kg Intercontinental Championship.

2019 KLF 70 kg Intercontinental Championship Tournament bracket

Results

Kunlun Fight 84

Kunlun Fight 84 was a kickboxing event held by Kunlun Fight on September 15, 2019 at the Chishui Stadium in Zunyi, China.

Results

Kunlun Fight 85

Kunlun Fight 85 was a kickboxing event held by Kunlun Fight on October 2, 2019 in Tongliao, Inner Mongolia, China.

Results

Kunlun Fight 86

Kunlun Fight 86 was a kickboxing event held by Kunlun Fight on October 3, 2019 in Tongliao, Inner Mongolia, China.

Results

Kunlun Fight 87

Kunlun Fight 87 was a kickboxing event held by Kunlun Fight on October 4, 2019 in Tongliao, Inner Mongolia, China.

Results

Kunlun Fight 88

Kunlun Fight 88 was a kickboxing event held by Kunlun Fight on December 25, 2019 at Yiwu International Expo Center in Yiwu, China.

Background
This event featured a 4-man 30-kilogram Tournaments to earn the 2019 KLF Future Star 30 kg Championship.

2019 KLF Future Star 30 kg Championship Tournament bracket

Results

See also
List of Kunlun Fight events
2019 in Glory
2019 in K-1
2019 in ONE Championship
2019 in Romanian kickboxing

References

2019 in kickboxing
Kickboxing in China
Kunlun Fight events
2019 in Chinese sport